Cry TV was a regional music television station broadcast in Christchurch, New Zealand between 1993 and 1997.

It broadcast on UHF channel 56 using a 100 Watt transmitter from a shed on Marleys Hill, on the Port Hills, near the Sugarloaf Transmitter. It was started by Christian Birch and Chris Clarkson.
Test transmissions consisted of a camera looking at an aquarium 24 hours a day for approximately 1 month during July and August 1993.

The channel was notable for the launch of the careers of Petra Bagust and Jason Fa'afoi.  Cry TV closed in April 1997, two months before TVNZ launched MTV.

References

Television channels and stations established in 1993
Television channels and stations disestablished in 1997
Defunct television channels in New Zealand
Music television channels
Mass media in Christchurch
Music organisations based in New Zealand